The 40th News & Documentary Emmy Awards were presented by the National Academy of Television Arts and Sciences (NATAS), honoring the best in American news and documentary programming in 2018. The ceremony took place on September 24, 2019, at the Lincoln Center's Alice Tully Hall in New York, United States. The nominations were announced on July 25, 2019, with CBS's news magazine 60 Minutes leading the nominations with 23 and PBS being the most nominated network with 47 nominations.

NBC News's chief foreign affairs correspondent and MSNBC's Andrea Mitchell Reports host Andrea Mitchell received the Lifetime Achievement Award for "her groundbreaking 50-year career covering domestic and international affairs.".

Winners and nominees
The nominations were announced on July 25, 2019.

Lifetime Achievement Award
 Andrea Mitchell

News Programming

Programming in Spanish

Documentary Programming

Craft

Regional News

Multiple wins

Multiple nominations

References

External links
 News & Documentary Emmys website

News and Documentary Emmy Awards
Emmy Awards